Jasenica is a populated settlement in the Mostar municipality, just south of the city of Mostar.

Demographics 
According to the 2013 census, its population was 1,573.

References

Populated places in Mostar
Villages in the Federation of Bosnia and Herzegovina